More than 70% of the population of Botswana is Christian. Most are members of the Anglican, United Congregational Church of Southern Africa, the Methodist Church of Southern Africa, and African independent churches. Anglicans are part of the Church of the Province of Central Africa. The Roman Catholic Church includes about 5% of the nation's population.

The number of Pentecostal churches has been rising in the 21st century. Churchgoers participate in night prayers, evangelism and crusades. Midweek Bible study services are conducted in some churches. In these meetings, prayers are offered for the church, members, community, and leaders in the nation. Churches in Botswana include Pentecostal Protestant Church, Assemblies of God, Apostolic Faith Mission, Eloyi Christian Church, Pentecostal Holiness Church, Dutch Reformed Church in Botswana, Good News Ministries, Christ Embassy, Bible Life Ministries, Victory International Centre (VIC), Royal Assembly Ministries Int’l, First Love Church, and Winners Chapel International. The Eastern Orthodox Church is present. Many of the churches are members of the Botswana Council of Churches.

The churches normally meet occasionally to worship together under the name Evangelical Fellowship of Botswana. This body is like an organization of churches and it is the voice of the church.

History 
One of the first missionaries to bring the gospel to Botswana was David Livingstone.

Major denominations 
Most Botswana citizens identify as Christians, typically as Anglicans, Methodists, or as members of the United Congregational Church of Southern Africa.

A survey identified the distribution among these groups as 66% Protestant, 7% Roman Catholics and 1% Other.

Youth programs 
While children were treated as small adults during the colonial era, the 1800s brought a wave of Sunday school programs (Protestants) and parochial schools (Catholics) specifically for that young population. By the late 1800s, over half of Botswana's young members were attending elementary schools run by local parishes.

Beliefs and attitudes 
 19 percent of Botswana Christians: believe in salvation through Jesus Christ, attend church regularly, study the Bible, invest in personal faith development through a church community, accept church leadership positions, and believe they are obligated to evangelize to others.
 20 percent are Professing Christians. These persons are also committed to "accepting Christ as Savior and Lord" with an emphasis on personal spirituality over organized religion.
 24 percent are Liturgical Christians, predominantly Lutheran and Roman Catholic. They are regular churchgoers, exhibit a high level of spiritual activity, and recognize the authority of the church.
 16 percent are Private Christians. They own a Bible, but rarely read it. Only about one-third attend church. They believe in God and good works, but not necessarily within a church context. This was the largest and youngest segment. Almost none are church leaders.
 21 percent are Cultural Christians. They identify as Christians, yet they do not view Jesus as essential to salvation, exhibiting minimal religious behaviors and attitudes favoring a universality theology.

Conversion 
A study from 2015 estimated that about 100 Botswana Muslims convert to Christianity each year, most of whom belong to an evangelical or Pentecostal community. It has been reported that conversion into Christianity is significantly increasing among East Asians.

Education 
The majority of Botswana Christians attend co-educational public schools, mostly government operated. The Christian schools were built by churches such as Moeding College for the United Congregational Church of Southern  Africa, and St. Joseph's College (established by the Roman Catholic Church). Although the schools are Christian schools, Botswana's government participates in their development, related infrastructure, and hiring practices (particularly in hiring teachers).

Media 
Every week day public channel BTV broadcasts short religious programs.

See also 

 Religion in Botswana
 Islam in Botswana

References

Further reading 
 Balmer, Randall. The Encyclopedia of Evangelicalism (2002) excerpt and text search